John C. "Jack" Lawn (born June 2, 1935) served as Administrator of the Drug Enforcement Administration (DEA) between 26 July 1985 and 23 March 1990. On 1 March 1985, Lawn, who had served as Deputy Administrator since 1982, was designated Acting Administrator following the retirement of Francis M. Mullen. On 4 April 1985, he was nominated by President Ronald Reagan to be the next Administrator of the DEA. Mr. Lawn was confirmed by the U.S. Senate on 16 July 1985, and sworn in on 26 July 1985.

Before coming to the DEA, Mr. Lawn had served for 15 years as a Special Agent of the Federal Bureau of Investigation (FBI) from 1967 to 1982. As Special Agent in Charge of the San Antonio field office from 1980 to 1982, he had directed the successful investigation into the assassination of U.S. District Judge John H. Wood, Jr. Before this historic case, Lawn had supervised all FBI civil rights cases, including allegations of police brutality and color of law complaints. In addition, he was responsible for background investigations of White House officials, federal judges, and US attorney nominees. He also served in the Criminal Division of FBI headquarters where he supervised the United States House Select Committee on Assassinations review of the 1963 assassination of John F. Kennedy and the 1968 assassination of Martin Luther King Jr.

From 1990-1994, Mr. Lawn served as vice-president and chief of operations of the New York Yankees. In 1998, he was serving as the chairman and CEO of The Century Council, a national organization dedicated to fighting alcohol abuse.  On Thursday, September 30, 2010, in Washington, D.C., the DEA Educational Foundation honored Mr. Lawn, presenting him with the 2010 DEA Educational Foundation Lifetime Achievement Award. This award was presented in recognition of his decades of leadership and commitment to drug law enforcement, drug abuse prevention, and drug treatment.

References

External links
DEA History (www.usdoj.gov/dea)

Heads of United States federal agencies
Baseball executives
Federal Bureau of Investigation agents
Drug Enforcement Administration Administrators
Living people
1935 births